Egbert I may refer to:

 Ecgberht of Kent, King of Kent from 664 to 673
 Ecgberht I of Northumbria (died 873), king
 Egbert I, Margrave of Meissen (died in 1068)